Szpaki-Kolonia  is a village in the administrative district of Gmina Stara Kornica, within Łosice County, Masovian Voivodeship, in east-central Poland.

References

Szpaki-Kolonia